This article is about music-related events in 1835.

Events
January 2 – The Neue Leipziger Zeitschrift für Musik, edited by Robert Schumann, changes its name to Neue Zeitschrift für Musik.
January 24 – Postponed premiere Vincenzo Bellini's I puritani in Théâtre-Italien Paris
January 25 – Hector Berlioz becomes resident music critic for the Journal des débats.
May 4 – Samuel Sebastian Wesley, son of the composer Samuel Wesley, grandson of Charles Wesley, and organist of Hereford Cathedral, elopes with and marries Mary Anne Merewether, sister of the cathedral's dean.
June 4 – Franz Liszt joins his mistress, Marie d'Agoult, in Basel, Switzerland.
July 8 – Dan Emmett is discharged from the US Army and begins his career as a blackface banjoist and singer.
October – Contralto Clorinda Corradi relocates to Havana, Cuba.
November 9 – At a concert in Johann Sebastian Bach's home city of Leipzig, Felix Mendelssohn, Clara Wieck and Louis Rakeman perform Bach's Concerto in D minor for three keyboards and orchestra.
November 28 – 25-year-old Robert Schumann and 16-year-old Clara Wieck begin their romance.
December 14 – The St James's Theatre, London, opens with an "operatic burletta", Agnes Sorel.
Soprano Fanny Corri-Paltoni makes her last known stage appearance, at Alessandria in Italy.
Gioachino Rossini completes Les soirées musicales which includes the patter song "La Danza".
Music department added to the Prussian Academy of Arts in Berlin.

Publications
Luigi Cherubini – Cours de contrepoint et de fugue

Classical music
Frédéric Chopin – Ballade No. 1
John Field – Nocturne No.14 in C major, H.60
Mikhail Glinka – Mazurka in F major
Fanny Hensel 
Wandl’ich In Dem Wald Des Abends, H-U 283
Ich Stand Gelehnet An Den Mast, H-U 284
über Allen Gipfeln Ist Ruh’, H-U 285
Wenn Der Frühling Kommt. H-U 286
Der Strauß H-U 287
Franz Liszt 
Duo (Sonata) on Polish Themes, for violin and piano, S.127
Réminiscences de La juive, for solo piano, S.409a
Otto Nicolai – Gran marcia funebre
Ferdinand Ries – Symphony No. 7
Robert Schumann – Carnaval, Op. 9
Alicia Anne Spottiswoode – "Annie Laurie"
Giuseppe Verdi – Messa solenne (Messa di Gloria)
Samuel Sebastian Wesley – Larghetto for Organ in F minor

Opera
Princess Amalie of Saxony – La casa disabitata
Daniel Auber – Le cheval de bronze
Vincenzo Bellini – I puritani
Gaetano Donizetti
Lucia di Lammermoor
Maria Stuarda
Fromental Halévy
L'éclair
La Juive
Giuseppe Persiani – Ines de Castro
Mikhail Zagoskin – Askold's Grave (Аскольдова могила, Askol’dova mogila)

Births
January 14 – Felix Otto Dessoff, conductor and composer (died 1892)
January 23 – August Lanner, composer
February 14 –  Louis Gallet, librettist (died 1898)
February 24 – John Henry Martin, band instrument manufacturer (died 1910)
March 1 – Ebenezer Prout, composer (died 1909)
March 15 – Eduard Strauss, composer (died 1916)
March 24 – August Winding, composer (died 1899)
March 30 – Bernhard Scholz, composer (died 1916)
July 10 – Henryk Wieniawski, violinist and composer (died 1880)
August 12 – Peter Piel, composer (died 1904)
August 20 – Oscar Stoumon, music critic and composer (died 1900)
September 28 – Jean Louis Gobbaerts, pianist (died 1886)
October 7 – Felix Draeseke, composer (died 1913)
October 9 – Camille Saint-Saëns, composer (died 1921)
October 11 – Theodore Thomas, conductor (died 1905)
November 25 – Joseph Glæser, organist and composer (died 1891)
December 1 – Carl Johan Frydensberg, composer (died 1904)
December 12 – Georges Jean Pfeiffer, composer (died 1908)
date unknown – Abu Khalil Qabbani, Syrian dramatist and composer (died 1902)

Deaths
February 19 – Amzi Chapin, cabinetmaker, singing-school teacher and shape note composer
April 23 – Joseph Antonio Emidy, violinist and composer (born 1775)
April 25 – François Tourte, bowmaker (born 1747)
May 9 – Sebastian Mayer, operatic bass (born 1773)
August 3 – Wenzel Müller, composer (born 1767)
August 10 – Claus Schall, violinist and composer (born 1757)
September 23 – Vincenzo Bellini, composer (born 1801)
October 21 – Muthuswami Dikshitar, youngest of the Carnatic music composer trinity (born 1775)
November 19
Thomas Linley the elder, musician and founder of a musical dynasty (born 1733)
Abraham Mendelssohn Bartholdy, banker and father of Felix and Fanny Mendelssohn (born 1776)

References

 
19th century in music
Music by year